G-Mode Archives is a series of re-releases of older mobile games for the Nintendo Switch console as well as Windows on Steam. The term "G-Mode Archives" on its own refers to titles that are developed or published by G-Mode, whereas G-Mode Archives+ refers to third-party releases. The series debuted on the Switch on April 16, 2020, and first appeared on PC on April 21, 2021.

Many of the games released as part of the series were originally Java-based games on Japanese mobile phones, for which a monthly fee was charged in order to play. They cover a wide variety of genres such as RPGs, puzzle games, simulation games and sports titles.

List of G-Mode Archives releases 

The following is the list of G-Mode Archives titles.

Currently,  games are available:

List of G-Mode Archives+ releases 

The following is the list of G-Mode Archives+ titles.

Currently,  games are available:

References

External links 

 Siliconera review of Flyhight Cloudia, the first title in the series

Marvelous Entertainment franchises
Nintendo Switch games
Windows games